is a Japanese photomodel and actor. He belongs to the talent agency LesPros Entertainment.

History
Nakamura Aoi entered the entertainment industry when he won the Grand Prix at the final round of the 18th Junon Superboy Contest held in November 2005. He was in the third year at junior high school and only 14 at the time, making him the first ever junior high school student Grand Prix winner.

Nakamura's father was responsible for sending in the application to the contest. Since Nakamura was a child he was called cute by those around him and his father wondered if it was really true, leading to the application. Nakamura himself was initially unenthusiastic about the contest as he disliked having to leave Fukuoka for Tokyo, and felt more apprehension than happiness when he won.

In October 2006, he made his debut as an actor in the stage play "Den-en ni Shisu", playing the lead role. At the end of March 2007, in order to start his entertainment activities seriously, he left his hometown of Fukuoka alone and moved to Tokyo. In July, he received his first lead role in a drama serial, "Boys Este". He also made his first movie appearance in the film "Koizora" which started showing in theatres November the same year.

Nakamura's first lead role in a movie "Hyakuhachi" showed in theatres in August 2008. In 2010, he was in movies one after another, including "Beck" and "Ooku". He also starred in "Paranormal Activity 2: Tokyo Night" that premiered in November 2010 and was released in more than 30 countries.

In 2011, from May to June, he played the leading role in stage play "Curry Life". In July, he played a semi-leading role in "Hanazakari no Kimitachi e 2011", a remake of popular drama serial.

Appearances

Movies
Hyakuhachi (2008) as Nobuhiro "Nobu" Kobayashi
Beck (2010) as Yuji "Saku" Sakurai
Perfect Blue (2010) as Shinya Moro'oka
Ooku (2010) as Kakizoe
Paranormal Activity 2: Tokyo Night (2010) as Koichi Yamano
Sabi Otoko Sabi Onna - Boy? meets girl. (2011) as Konosuke Muratsubaki
Hoshi no Furumachi (2011) as Kotaro Tsutsumi
Kimi to Boku (2011) as young man
My Back Page (2011) as Hiroshi Shibayama
Ike! Genshi Koukouen Gekibu (2011) as Genki Ogasawara
Hara ga Kore Nande (2011) - Yōichi Kodama
Kiyoku Yawaku (2013) as Toshikuni Mayama
Tokyo Nanmin (2014) as Osamu Tokieda
Library Wars: The Last Mission (2015)
Recall (2018) as Hajime Sugimoto
Momi's House (2020)
Nemesis: The Movie (2023) as Yūji Shimanto

TV dramas
Shinigami no Ballad episode 5 (TV Tokyo, 2007) as Daiki Ikuma
Boys Este (TV Tokyo, 2007) as Hibiki Akagi
The Yasumi Jikan (Disney Channel Japan, 2008-2009) as Akira
Gakko ja Oshierarenai! (NTV, 2008) as Kazuki Mizuki
Q.E.D. Shomei Shuryo (NHK, 2009) as So Toma
Tsutaetai! Bokura no Yume Chōdōken ga Oshiete Kureta Chikara ~Asunaro Gakkō no Monogatari~ (TBS, 2009) as Akira Takahara
Otokomae! 2 episode 12 (NHK, 2009) as Hisanao Hasegawa
Angel Bank ~Tenshoku Dairinin (TV Asahi, 2010) as Natsuki Emura
Perfect Blue (WOWOW, 2010) as Shinya Moro'oka
Propose Kyodai ~Umare Jun Betsu Otoko ga Kekkon Suru Hōhō~ episode 3 (Fuji TV, 2011) as Saburo Yamada
Saisei Kyoryu (WOWOW, 2011) as Hideki Hōrai
Marumo no Okite last episode (Fuji TV, 2011) as Izumi Sano (special appearance)
Hanakazari no Kimitachi e 2011 (Fuji TV, 2011) as Izumi Sano
Majutsu wa Sasayaku (Fuji TV, 2011) as Mamoru Takagi
Blackboard ~Jidai to Tatakatta Kyōshitachi~ episode 1 (TBS, 2012) as Takefumi Baba
Legal High episode 1 (Fuji TV, 2012) as Yūichi Tsubokura
Iki mo Dekinai Natsu (Fuji TV, 2012) as Kota Kusano
Monsters last episode (TBS, 2012) as Junpei Sekine
Akujotachi no Mesu Episode 2 (Fuji TV, 2012) as Seiichi Ishizuka
Byakkotai ~Yaburezarushatachi (TV Tokyo, 2013) as Gisaburo Shinoda
Tank Top Fighter (MBS, 2013) as Sora Kureda
Yae no Sakura (NHK, 2013) as Tokutomi Sohō
Zainin no Uso (WOWOW, 2014) as Hirose
The Thorns of Alice (TBS, 2014) as Yuma Bandai
Kabuki-Mono Keiji (NHK, 2015) as Shinkuro
Mutsu: Mieru Me (Fuji TV, 2015) as Ibara
Yell (NHK, 2020) as Tetsuo Murano
Nemesis (NTV, 2021) as Yūji Shimanto
 Kamen Rider Black Sun (Amazon Prime Video, 2022) as young Kotaro Minami
 Ranman (NHK, 2023) as Yūichirō Hirose

Mobile dramas
Sekai no Owari ni Saku Hana (BeeTV, 2010) as Taiyo Yano
L et M Watashi ga Anata wo Aisuru Riyu, Sono Hoka no Monogatari (BeeTV, 2012) as Kei Kurata

Stage plays
Den-en ni Shisu (2006) as youth Terayama
Curry Life (2011) as Kensuke
Curry Life (Recitation) (2011) as Kensuke
Atami Satsujin Jiken NEXT~Kuwae Tabako Denbee Sōsa Nisshi~ (2012) as Kintaro Oyama
Tsuku, Kieru (2013) as young person working in hotel
Sanada Jūyūshi (2014) as Daisuke Sanada

Radio drama
Kamisari Nānā Nichijō (NHK-FM, 2010) as Yūki Hirano

Variety
Namae de Yobu na tte! (TVK, Chiba TV, Mie TV, and KBS Kyoto 2007)
Countdown Document Byou Yomi! (Chūkyō TV, 2009)

Commercials
Tokyo Disney Resort (2007)
SoftBank Mobile (2008)
Calpis Water (2009)
NTT East (2010-2011)
Weider in Jelly (2011)
NTT DoCoMo (2012)
Asahi Breweries Cocktail Partner (2012)

Music videos
2Backka - Harebare (2009)
Lecca - Clown Love (Short Movie) (2012)

Events
Opening pitch ceremony for baseball game between Yokohama DeNA BayStars and Hanshin Tigers (Yokohama Stadium, August 3, 2008)
Fashion show Fukuoka Asia Collection (FACo) 2010 Spring-Summer (Fukuoka Kokusai Center, March 21, 2010)
Fashion show Kansai Collection 2011 Spring-Summer (Osaka Dome, February 11, 2011)

Net stream programs
Ameba Studio Taiyō no Messa￮￮Shaberi Taiyō ~Nichigoji~ #5 guest (September 28, 2008)
Goomo Choi to Matatabi MODE ~Oyamamairihen~ (September 2009)
Ameba Studio Imalu & Jxjx no Chō Chō Chō!!! Jiyū Jikan #24 guest (December 4, 2009)

Publications

Photobooks
Aoi Biyori (October 3, 2008)
Hatachi (March 4, 2011)

Books
Kitamura Eiki to Nakamura Aoi no Let's Lovinglish! - Ikemen ni Kudokarenagara Manabu! Ren'ai Eikaiwa (October 2007)

Magazine column
Cinema★Cinema - Nakamura Aoi no a Day In The Life (April 2011 – present)

DVD releases
Namae de Yobu na tte! Real Face Series Nakamura Aoi ~I'll do my best together~ (September 21, 2007)
Holiday (November 25, 2009)

References

External links
 
 Nakamura Aoi Profile on LesPros
 Nakamura Aoi Official Blog 
 Nakamura Aoi Official Fanclub
 

1991 births
Living people
21st-century Japanese male actors